Mujer bonita (English: Pretty Woman) is a mini Mexican telenovela that lasted only two weeks of transmission, produced by Ignacio Sada for Televisa in 2001. It is an adaptation of the telenovela La mesera produced in 1963.

Plot 
Charito is a beautiful girl who falls in love with Orlando, a rich, young man whose parents oppose of their relationship. To be together, they decide to go to Mexico City, only to face many problems, especially economic, because Orlando does not get a job and his family refuses to support him in any way. Charito gets pregnant, and things gets complicated, because in addition she falls sick with anemia, resulting in her being admitted to the hospital. Meanwhile, Orlando starts to get tired of the situation, and even said himself it was a mistake to have abandoned all for Charito.

Cast 

 Adriana Fonseca as Charito
 René Strickler as José Enrique
 Abraham Ramos as Orlando
 María Sorté as Sol
Alejandra Peniche as Rebeca
Mónica Dossetti as Sandra
Roberto Ballesteros as Servando
Rosa María Bianchi as Carolina
Beatriz Moreno as Jesusa
Eduardo Liñán as Eleuterio
Sharis Cid as Aurora
Sherlyn as Milagros
Silvia Caos as Doña Blanca
Gloria Morell as Josefita
Bárbara Gil as Mariana
Ricardo Blume as Damián
Claudio Báez as Dr. Somoza
Laura Zapata/Silvia Manríquez as Celia
Sergio Sendel as Miguel
Lucero Lander as Dr. Garibay
Sergio Reynoso as Enrique
Guillermo García Cantú as Leopoldo
César Castro as Sr. Martínez
Maripaz García as Bernarda
Isabel Martínez "La Tarabilla" as Rafaela
Yessica Salazar as Nelly
Sara Montes as Teresa
Claudia Ortega as Micaela
Héctor Parra as Daniel
Eduardo Rodríguez as Virgilio
Irma Torres as Filomena
María Clara Zurita as Dominga
Esperanza Rendón as La China

References

External links 
 

2001 telenovelas
Mexican telenovelas
2001 Mexican television series debuts
2001 Mexican television series endings
Televisa telenovelas
Spanish-language telenovelas